Jean-Claude Sala is a former male French international table tennis player.

He won a bronze medal at the 1953 World Table Tennis Championships in the Swaythling Cup (men's team event) with Guy Amouretti, Michel Haguenauer, Michel Lanskoy and René Roothooft.

He was a twice French National doubles champion in 1954 and 1955 with Stephen Cafiero.

See also
 List of table tennis players
 List of World Table Tennis Championships medalists

References

French male table tennis players
World Table Tennis Championships medalists